The Iron Ring is a 1917 American silent drama film directed by George Archainbaud and starring Edward Langford, Gerda Holmes and Arthur Ashley. It was shot at Fort Lee in New Jersey.

Cast
 Edward Langford as Aleck Hulette 
 Gerda Holmes as Bess Hulette 
 Arthur Ashley as Jack Delamore 
 J. Herbert Frank as Ellery Leonard 
 George MacQuarrie as Stephen Graves 
 George Cowl as Charles Brown 
 Alexandria Carewe as Mrs. Georgie Leonard 
 Gladys Thompson as Dorothy Delamore 
 Victor Kennard as Dr. Hogue 
 Richard Clarke as Sloane

References

Bibliography
 Paul C. Spehr. The Movies Begin: Making Movies in New Jersey, 1887-1920. Newark Museum, 1977.

External links
 

1917 films
1917 drama films
1910s English-language films
American silent feature films
Silent American drama films
Films directed by George Archainbaud
American black-and-white films
World Film Company films
Films shot in Fort Lee, New Jersey
1910s American films